The ICTI Ethical Toy Program (IETP) is an independent, not-for-profit organisation established in 2004 to safeguard and improve ethical and sustainability standards in the global toy industry supply chain.

The ICTI Ethical Toy Program oversees the Ethical Toy Program, the ethical manufacturing program for the toy industry. The Ethical Toy Program is the most widespread labor and social standard in the toy industry. The program is based on the ICTI Code of Business Practices. It is estimated that 70% of global toy sales are covered by the Ethical Toy Program.

History of the ICTI Ethical Toy Program 

Working conditions in Asian toy factories in the 1990s were under intense scrutiny, most notably following the Kader Toy Factory Fire in Bangkok (Thailand), considered the worst industrial factory fire in history, and a toy factory fire in Shenzhen (China) in 1993 which together caused more than 250 deaths. As a reaction to the tragedy, the Hong Kong Toy Coalition was established and published the "Charter on the Safe Production of Toys" in the mid-1990s. In this charter, the Hong Kong Toy Coalition demanded the improvement of labor, social, and safety standards in Chinese toy factories.

Following the production of the charter, larger toy brands and retailers started to create their own Codes of Conduct. Hasbro established its “Global Business Ethics Principles” in 1993, Zapf Creation a code of conduct in 1995, The Walt Disney Company its “International Labor Standards” in 1996, Mattel its “Global Manufacturing Principles” 1997, and LEGO created a code of conduct in 1997. It is estimated that there were up to 70 different standards which made it difficult for toy factories to comply with varying standards and created significant amounts of duplication of auditing in factories. Therefore, an industry wide ethical manufacturing standard was called for in the toy industry.

The International Council of Toy Industries (ICTI) created the Code of Business Practices in 1995. In 2002 at the annual general meeting of ICTI, the member toy industry associations unanimously agreed to launch the ICTI CARE Process, a worldwide auditing process to implement the ICTI Code of Business Practices, drive convergence, and reduce duplication of social auditing in the global toy industry supply chain.

In 2004, the ICTI CARE Foundation was created as a non-profit organisation working completely independently of ICTI to oversee the ICTI CARE Process.

In 2018, the organization became the ICTI Ethical Toy Program. Along with a new name, the next generation of the Ethical Toy Program was unveiled with an updated mission and strategy for the organization, a new membership model and a brand-new look and feel to deliver the changes.

Ethical Toy Program Certification Program 

Ethical Toy Program is the ethical manufacturing program specifically designed for the toy industry based on the ICTI Code of Business Practices.

ICTI Code of Business Practices 

The ICTI Code of Business Practices, upon which the Ethical Toy Program is based, covers nine core principals:
 Working hours must not be excessive & overtime must be voluntary
 Legal and fair pay
 No child labor
 No forced or involuntary labor
 No discrimination
 Employees must be treated with dignity and respect
 Employees' right of association must be observed 
 Individual written labor contracts must be provided 
 Working conditions are safe and employee health is not endangered

Certification 

When a factory is awarded a Seal of Compliance by the Ethical Toy Program this denotes their adherence to the Ethical Toy Program. The Ethical Toy Program offers Seals of Compliance from Class A to C depending on the maximum number of hours worked.

See also
Fair trade
Certification
Toy Industry Association

References 

Business organisations based in Hong Kong
Business ethics organizations
Toy industry